Aphalangy-syndactyly-microcephaly syndrome is a very rare limb malformation syndrome which is characterized by agenesis of the distal phalanges (distal aphalangia), syndactyly, duplication of the fourth metatarsal, microcephaly, and mild intellectual disabilities. Only 6 cases from 4 families in Spain, Turkey and other countries  have been reported in medical literature. Transmission is autosomal dominant.

References 

Rare genetic syndromes
Autosomal dominant disorders